The 1985–86 Iraqi National Clubs First Division was the 12th season of the competition since its foundation in 1974. Unlike the previous season, each win was worth two points rather than three. Al-Talaba won their third league title out of the past five completed seasons, finishing two points ahead of Al-Rasheed and only losing one match.

League table

Results

Season statistics

Top scorers

Hat-tricks

Notes
4 Player scored 4 goals

References

External links
 Iraq Football Association

Iraqi Premier League seasons
1985–86 in Iraqi football
Iraq